Adliyya Baku was an Azerbaijani football club based in Baku. Playing in the town of Baku. The club played at the Adliyya Stadium (capacity 7.000). Last time the football club competed in 2010–11 Azerbaijan First Division. On 15 March 2011, it was announced that the club has been kicked out of the national competition. The reason was shown as the dissolution of the club. It was also stated that the withdrawal from the competition is temporary. However, the return of the club is unknown.

League and domestic cup history

References

Football clubs in Azerbaijan
2001 establishments in Azerbaijan
2011 disestablishments in Azerbaijan